Ranjana can stand for:

 Ranjana script, an abugida writing system derived from Brāhmī in the 11th century
 Ranjana Deshmukh, Indian actress who worked in Marathi cinema in the 70s and 80s